This is a list of television stations are based or broadcast in Bangkok.

Bangkok commercial terrestrial channels
Bangkok commercial free-to-air stations include:

TrueVisions Bangkok

TrueVisions Bangkok channels
True Korean More
True Select
True4U
True Chinese More
True Asian More
True Film HD1
True Film HD2
True Film Asia 
True Inside
True Plook Panya
True Reality
True Series
True Spark Play
True Spark Jump
True Sport 1 
True Sport 2 
True Sport 3 
True Tennis HD 
True Sport 5 
True Sport 6
True Sport 7
True Sport HD1
True Sport HD2
True Sport HD3
True Sport HD4
True Thai Film
True X-Zyte 
True Shopping 
True Explore Wild
True Explore Life
True Explore Sci
True Movie Hits
True Music
TNN 16
TNN 2

See also
Media of Thailand

Stations in Bangkok
Bangkok
Bangkok-related lists
Bangkok